The 2008 Sobeys Slam was held November 27–30 at the John Brother MacDonald Stadium in New Glasgow, Nova Scotia. It was the fourth of five women's Grand Slam events during the 2008-09 curling season. It was the last Sobeys Slam before a one-year hiatus. It was also the second season where the event was a Slam. The total purse was $C 60,000 with $16,000 going to the champion Marie-France Larouche rink

Teams
 Mary-Anne Arsenault
 Ève Bélisle
 Cheryl Bernard
 Suzanne Birt
 Donna Butler
 Chrissy Cadorin
 Alison Goring
 Karri-Lee Grant
 Amber Holland
 Jennifer Jones
 Andrea Kelly
 Cathy King
 Shannon Kleibrink
 Patti Lank
 Marie-France Larouche
 Stefanie Lawton
 Carrie Lindner
 Krista McCarville
 Nancy McConnery
 Janet McGhee
 Sherry Middaugh
 Jill Mouzar
 Karen Porritt
 Heather Rankin
 Julie Reddick
 Sylvie Robichaud
 Kelly Scott
 Renée Sonnenberg
 Aileen Sormunen
 Heather Strong
 Wang Bingyu
 Crystal Webster

Playoffs

External links
WCT Event page

Sobeys Slam, 2008
New Glasgow, Nova Scotia